Rik de Voest and Lu Yen-hsun were the defending champions but decided not to participate.
Colin Fleming and Scott Lipsky won the final because their opponents Matthias Bachinger and Benjamin Becker withdrew.

Seeds

Draw

Draw

References
 Main Draw

Status Athens Open - Doubles
2011 Doubles